Harbour Buffett was a Way Office established in 1854. The first Waymaster was Thomas E. Collett. It was changed to a Post Office on May 30th 1891. It was only served by the Canadian National Railway in 1953.

Harbour Buffett was established in 1836. It was a small place with ten families in the St. Mary's area by 1864. The Way Station became a Post Office in 1891.

Harbour Buffett, located on the southeastern side of Long Island in inner Placentia Bay, has a deep, sheltered harbour. It recorded a population of 266 (down from the previous census figure of 285) in 1966, shortly before suffering abandonment, another victim of the controversial Resettlement program.  Both Harbour Buffett itself and it's smaller sub-settlement Northeast Arm Harbour Buffett were evacuated, along with the smaller still population at Whiffin's Cove, leaving the harbour empty.  Reunions in summer are frequent, as at Merasheen on the island of the same name.

See also
List of communities in Newfoundland and Labrador
References on main article page.

Ghost towns in Newfoundland and Labrador